Marcus Acilius Glabrio (fl. 1st century BC) was a Roman senator who was appointed consul suffectus in 33 BC.

Biography
Acilius was a Roman politician from the gens Acilia and a supporter of the Second Triumvirate. He may have been the son of Manius Acilius Glabrio, consul suffectus in 67 BC. In 33 he was appointed one of four consuls who succeeded Octavianus after he resigned the office.  Acilius probably held the office from July to October.

In 25, Acilius was appointed the proconsular governor of Africa.

Footnotes

References

Sources
 PIR ² A 71
 Broughton, T. Robert S., The Magistrates of the Roman Republic, Vol II (1952)

1st-century BC Roman consuls
Glabrio, Marcus 721
Roman governors of Africa
Year of birth unknown
Year of death unknown